The 2016 Arkansas Razorbacks football team represented the University of Arkansas in the 2016 NCAA Division I FBS football season. The Razorbacks played their home games at Donald W. Reynolds Razorback Stadium in Fayetteville and War Memorial Stadium in Little Rock. Arkansas played as a member of the Western Division of the Southeastern Conference (SEC). They were led by fourth-year head coach Bret Bielema. They finished the season 7–6, 3–5 in SEC play to finish in a tie for fifth place in the Western Division. They were invited to the Belk Bowl where they lost to Virginia Tech, in a game where the Razorbacks blew a 24-0 lead at halftime.

Schedule
Arkansas announced its 2016 football schedule on October 29, 2015. The 2016 schedule consists of 7 home games, 4 away games, and 1 neutral site game in the regular season. The Razorbacks will host SEC foes Alabama, Florida, LSU, and Ole Miss, and will travel to Auburn, Mississippi State, and Missouri. Arkansas played against Texas A&M for the eighth year in a row in Arlington, Texas.

The Razorbacks will travel to Fort Worth, Texas to compete against TCU for the first time since 1991, which was the year before the Razorbacks left the Southwest Conference for the SEC. Arkansas will host the three other non–conference games; against Alcorn State from the Southwestern Conference in Little Rock, and versus Louisiana Tech from Conference USA and Texas State from the Sun Belt Conference in Fayetteville.

Schedule Source:

Game summaries

Louisiana Tech

at TCU

Texas State

vs Texas A&M

Alcorn State

Alabama

Ole Miss

at Auburn

Florida

LSU

at Mississippi State

at Missouri

vs Virginia Tech (Belk Bowl)

Rankings

References

Arkansas
Arkansas Razorbacks football seasons
Arkansas Razorbacks football